Veliki Vrh is a small settlement east of Nova Vas in the Municipality of Bloke in the Inner Carniola region of Slovenia.

Geography
Veliki Vrh includes the hamlet of Podveliki Vrh south of the main part of the settlement.

References

External links
Veliki Vrh on Geopedia

Populated places in the Municipality of Bloke